St. Joseph's School, Hassan, also collectively called St. Joseph's Institutions, Hassan, is a private Catholic primary and secondary school and private pre-university college located in Hassan, in the state of Karnataka, India. The school was founded by the Jesuits in 1956 and is now run in conjunction with the Sisters of Mercy of the Holy Cross. The compound has grown to include a primary school (K through 5), medium school (6 through 10), and pre-university college (11 and 12).

Background
Founded in 1956, St. Joseph's is one of the oldest educational institutions established in Hassan. The kindergarten has grown to enrol 65, the primary and high schools 1,413, and the preuniversity college over 600 students.

In 2009, the Jesuits established St. Joseph's College, a university college affiliated with the University of Mysore.

See also

 List of Jesuit schools
 List of schools in Karnataka
 Violence against Christians in India

References

Jesuit secondary schools in India
Jesuit primary schools in India
Christian schools in Karnataka
Primary schools in Karnataka
High schools and secondary schools in Karnataka
Schools in Hassan district
Educational institutions established in 1956
1956 establishments in Mysore State
Pre University colleges in Karnataka